Natrix maura is a natricine water snake of the genus Natrix. Its common name is viperine water snake or viperine snake. Despite its common names, it is not a member of the subfamily Viperinae. This nonvenomous, semiaquatic, fish-eating snake was given its common names due to behavioural and aesthetic similarities with sympatric adder species.

Behaviour
The viperine snake looks like an adder and behaves like one. It is known to strike like an adder, but not bite. However, when in water, the viperine snake then looks like a grass snake and hunts its prey in the same way. This snake is diurnal.
Viperine water snakes are not aggressive and rarely bite. They spend most of their time in water hunting fish, frogs and other aquatic animals.

Geographic range
The viperine snake is found in southwestern Europe and northwestern Africa. Specifically, N. maura is found in the European countries of: Portugal, Spain, France, northernwest Italy, and even into Switzerland. It has spread to areas of England, as well. It is found in African countries of Morocco, northern Algeria, northwestern Libya, and northern to central Tunisia.

Description

N. maura is gray, brown, or reddish dorsally, with a black zigzag vertebral stripe, and lateral series of black ocelli with yellow centers. The labials are yellow with black sutures. It has a diagonal dark band on each temple, and another behind it on each side of the neck. Ventrally, it is yellow or red, checkered with black, or all black.

The strongly keeled dorsal scales are arranged in 21 rows. The ventrals are 147–160; the anal plate is divided; and the paired subcaudals number 47–72.

Adults may attain a total length of 85 cm (33 inches), with a tail 17 cm (7 inches) long.

Habitat
The viperine snake is found in rivers and lakes, and has also been recorded from areas of brackish water.

Invasion
Invasive on Mallorca.

Ecology of invasion
N. maura predates on Pelophylax perezi among other prey on Mallorca. Research by Moore et al. 2004 suggests trophic subsidy provided by P. perezi is maintaining higher numbers of the invader than would otherwise occur.

Evolutionary effects
N. maura has altered the behavior of Mallorcan prey. Moore et al. 2004 finds that the higher numbers mentioned above are allowing the invader to exert such high pressure that prey species have retreated entirely to habitats too steep for N. maura.

See also
 List of reptiles of Italy

References

External links
 Euroherp.com

Further reading
Arnold EN, Burton JA. 1978. A Field Guide to the Reptiles and Amphibians of Britain and Europe. London: Collins. 272 pp. . (Natrix maura, pp. 202–204 + Plate 37 + Map 115).
Linnaeus C. 1758. Systema naturæ per regna tria naturæ, secundum classes, ordines, genera, species, cum characteribus, differentiis, locis. Tomus I. Editio Decima, Reformata. Stockholm: L. Salvius. 824 pp. (Coluber maurus, new species, p. 219). (in Latin).

Natrix
Snakes of Africa
Reptiles of North Africa
Reptiles of Europe
Reptiles described in 1758
Taxa named by Carl Linnaeus